Tangled Wool is a 2006 album released by the electronica music artist Xela under the label City Centre Offices.

Track list
 Softness of Senses – 4:40
 Smiles and Bridges – 4:41
 You Are in the Stars – 5:03
 Drawing Pictures of Girls – 4:49
 Through Crimson Clouds – 5:26
 Quiet Night – 5:13
 So No Goodbyes – 5:02
 Her Eyes Sparkled and She Walked Away – 5:55
 Total album length – 40:49

References
 Xela’s Tangled Wool – Amazon.co.uk product information page

2006 albums